Keith Michael Simons (April 26, 1954 – July 26, 2017) was an American football player.  He was a defensive tackle who played for the Kansas City Chiefs and St. Louis Cardinals of the National Football League.  He played college football at the University of Minnesota.  He was named to the Associated Press All-Big Ten team in 1975.

Simons was selected by the Chiefs with the 63rd pick in the 3rd round of the 1976 NFL Draft.  He made his presence felt in his very first preseason game, when he blocked a field goal attempt in overtime and teammate Emmitt Thomas recovered the ball and returned it for a game winning touchdown.  He was placed on the injured reserve list in October after tearing knee ligaments in a game against the Miami Dolphins.  Simons played in 6 games for the Chiefs during the regular season in 1976, starting all 6.  In 1977, he played in all 16 games for the Chiefs, again starting 6.  The Chiefs traded him to the New Orleans Saints before the 1978 season but the Saints cut him before the season started.  He was signed by the Cardinals in September 1978 and played two seasons for the Cardinals as a backup nose tackle, getting into 29 games.  The Cardinals released him before the 1980 season. Diagnosed with bladder and lung cancer earlier in the year, he died on July 26, 2017 at the age of 63.

References

1954 births
2017 deaths
American football defensive tackles
Kansas City Chiefs players
St. Louis Cardinals (football) players
Minnesota Golden Gophers football players
Sportspeople from Ypsilanti, Michigan
Players of American football from Michigan
Deaths from bladder cancer
Deaths from lung cancer
Deaths from cancer in Minnesota